Erythranthe cardinalis, the scarlet monkeyflower, is a flowering perennial in the family Phrymaceae. Together with other species in Mimulus section Erythranthe, it serves as a model system for studying pollinator-based reproductive isolation. It was formerly known as Mimulus cardinalis.

Description
It is a fairly large, spreading, attractive plant which bears strongly reflexed, nectar-rich red or orange-red flowers and toothed, downy leaves. It is native to the West Coast and Southwestern United States and Baja California, and is generally found at low elevation in moist areas. Occasional populations of yellow-flowered Erythranthe cardinalis (which lack anthocyanin pigments in their corollas) are found in the wild.

Cultivation
Erythranthe cardinalis is cultivated in the horticulture trade and widely available as an ornamental plant for: traditional gardens; natural landscape, native plant, and habitat gardens; and various types of municipal, commercial, and agency sustainable landscape projects.  Cultivars come in a range of colors between yellow and red, including the "Santa Cruz Island Gold" variety, originally collected from Santa Cruz Island off the coast of California.

In the UK it has gained the Royal Horticultural Society's Award of Garden Merit. A short-lived perennial, it is often grown as an annual. It requires a wet, poorly-drained soil in full sun, in a sheltered position.

Pollination
Its blooms and large nectar load attract hummingbirds, whose foreheads serve as the pollen transfer surface between flowers.  In the area where it overlaps with its sister species, Erythranthe lewisii, reproductive isolation is maintained almost exclusively through pollinator preference.

References

External links
 Calflora Database: Erythranthe cardinalis (Cardinal monkey flower)
 Jepson eFlora Treatment of Mimulus cardinalis
 Mimulus cardinalis — UC Photos gallery

cardinalis
Flora of British Columbia
Flora of California
Flora of Oregon
Flora of Washington (state)
Flora of the Southwestern United States
Flora of Baja California
Flora of the Cascade Range
Flora of the Klamath Mountains
Flora of the Sierra Nevada (United States)
Natural history of the California chaparral and woodlands
Garden plants of North America
Bird food plants
Flora without expected TNC conservation status